Melissa Davis is an American voice actress known for her voice-over work in English-language dubs of Japanese anime. She has worked with dubbing companies ADV Films and Seraphim Digital. Her major roles include Kate Ashley in Red Garden, Shiina in Angel Beats, and Mai Kawasumi in Kanon.

Voice roles
Angel Beats! - Shiina
Appleseed: Ex Machina - Yoshino
Broken Blade - General Sakura (Movie 2), Nike
Clannad - Botan, Girl from Illusionary World (Ushio Okazaki)
Demon King Daimao - Kena Soga
Devil May Cry - Lady
Dream Eater Merry - Chizuru Kawanami
Ghost Hound - Chika Nakajima, Yoshimi Iwasaki
Gilgamesh - Cinque
Guyver: The Bioboosted Armor - Additional Voices
The Guin Saga - Flori
Halo Legends - Han (The Duel)
ICE - Kisaragi
Kanon - Mai Kawasumi
Kiba - Elmeida
Le Chevalier D'Eon - Queen Mary Charlotte
Loups=Garous - Hazuki Makino
Mythical Detective Loki Ragnarok - Skuld
Night Raid 1931 - Ai-Ling (Ep. 5)
Pani Poni Dash! - Kurumi Momose
Red Garden - Kate Ashley
Samurai Girls - Ginsen Yagyuu (as Teresa Krowd)
Shattered Angels - Additional Voices
Starship Troopers: Invasion - Ice Blonde
The World God Only Knows - Sora Asuka
Tokyo Majin - Maiko Takamizawa
Un-Go - Sayo Izawa (Ep. 7-8)

External links
Melissa Davis at the CrystalAcids Anime Voice Actor Database

American voice actresses
Living people
Year of birth missing (living people)